Inaburra School, is an independent Christian co-educational primary and secondary day school, located in Bangor, a southern suburb of Sydney, New South Wales, Australia. Established in 1982, Inaburra caters for students from Year K to Year 12.

Inaburra is a project of the Menai Baptist Church, however is an independent Christian school with non-selective enrolment policy.

Governance
Inaburra School is operated by Inaburra School Limited. The principal and all staff are employed by Inaburra School Limited.

History
The establishment of the Inaburra School can be credited to the Menai Baptist Church who originally wished to establish a Christian school in Menai. The church identified a need for a Christian school in the area due to its rapidly growing population and the lack of a government high school.

A portable building was erected close to the Billa Road site for the use of the preschool and church in 1980, and in 1982 Inaburra officially commenced as a secondary school in temporary accommodation at the Christian Education Center at Gymea Baptist Church.

The name 'Inaburra' was chosen as it is a local Aboriginal word meaning 'dream'.

Principals

Curriculum
Inaburra School is a registered and accredited school, teaching the NSW Board of Studies Curriculum from Kindergarten to Year 12. Students undertake all NAPLAN tests and the Higher School Certificate in Year 12.

Inaburra has two sections:

The Junior School (Kindergarten to Year 6).
The Senior School (Year 7 to Year 12).

The Junior School and Senior School are both located on the Inaburra Campus.

Notable alumni

 Michael Cain, Greco-Roman wrestling silver medalist
 Matt Corby, singer/songwriter
 Brielle Davis, Australian recording artist
 Melissa Leong, Masterchef Australia Judge
 Rohan Browning, Olympian Sprinter

See also

 List of non-government schools in New South Wales

References

External links
 Inaburra School Website
 Inaburra School - Fee Schedule
 Inaburra School Annual Report 2018

Private primary schools in Sydney
Private secondary schools in Sydney
Nondenominational Christian schools in Sydney
Independent Schools Association (Australia)
1982 establishments in Australia
Educational institutions established in 1982
Sutherland Shire